NK Graničar is a Croatian football club based in the town of Županja in Slavonia.

Honours 

 Treća HNL – East:
Winners (1): 2004–05

Football clubs in Croatia
Football clubs in Vukovar-Srijem County
Association football clubs established in 1920
1920 establishments in Croatia